Back to the River is the fifth studio album by blues musician Susan Tedeschi, released October 28, 2008, on Verve Forecast.

Production was handled by Tedeschi herself and her husband Derek Trucks, with George Drakoulias co-producing all tracks except "Butterfly". Upon its debut, Back to the River received favorable reviews from music critics. The album peaked at number one on the Billboard Top Blues Albums.

Reception
The album has received positive reception from critics. In a review for AllMusic, Steve Leggett praised Tedeschi's improved songwriting and called her singing "a wonderful instrument, strong and hushed by turns." The album was nominated for the 2010 Grammy Award for Best Contemporary Blues Album, her fifth Grammy nomination to date, but lost to her husband's Already Free.

Track listing 

Note: The vinyl edition omits "There's a Break in the Road".

Personnel 
 Susan Tedeschi – vocals, guitar
 Tyler Greenwell – drums, percussion
 Ted Pecchio – bass guitar
 Matt Slocum –  keyboards, piano
 Dave Yoke – guitar
 Derek Trucks – guitar
 Gary Louris – guitar, background vocals
 Alex Budman – saxophone
 Rob Hardt – saxophone
 Jamie Horvorka – trumpet
 Jeremy Levy – trombone
 Kyle Newmaster – trumpet
 George Drakoulias – background vocals, percussion
 Julia Waters – background vocals
 Maxine Willard Waters – background vocals
 Brendan O'Brien – guitar
 Josh Schwartz – guitar
 Robert Walter – clavinet

Charts

Weekly

References

External links 
 

Susan Tedeschi albums
2008 albums
Albums produced by George Drakoulias